Complete results for Men's Giant Slalom competition at the 2011 World Championships. It ran on February 18 at 10:00 local time (1st run) and 13:30 local time (2nd run), the ninth race of the championships. 123 athletes from 51 countries competed in the qualification race on February 17.

Results

Race

Qualification

References

Giant slalom, men's